LOLA is a 2022 Irish-British found footage science fiction film directed by Andrew Legge, starring Emma Appleton and Stefanie Martini. The film is Legge's feature directorial debut.

Plot
England, 1941, sisters Thomasina and Martha have created a machine that can intercept broadcasts from the future. This delightful apparatus allows them to explore their inner punk a generation before the movement comes into existence. But with World War II escalating, the sisters decide to use the machine as a weapon of intelligence, with world-altering consequences.

Cast
 Emma Appleton as Martha "Mars" Hanbury
 Stefanie Martini as Thomasina "Thom" Hanbury
 Rory Fleck Byrne as Lieutenant Sebastien Holloway
 Aaron Monaghan as Cobcroft
 Shaun Boylan as Reginald Watson

Production
Lola was shot in Ireland during lockdown. The scenes between the sisters in their house were shot on 16mm Bolex and Arriflex cameras with period lenses while the newsreel scenes were shot on a 1930s Newman Sinclair 35mm wind up camera on Kodak Double X film. The actresses were trained in how to use the cameras with Stefanie Martini operating the shots which her character is shooting. Much of the film was home processed using a Soviet era 16mm developing tank. Neil Hannon of the Divine Comedy wrote the soundtrack which also features Space Oddity by David Bowie, a rearranged version of You Really Got Me by the Kinks and music by Elgar.

Release
The film premiered at the Locarno Film Festival on 5 August 2022.

Reception
David Ehrlich of IndieWire gave the film a rating of "B", writing that "The genius of Legge’s design, and why his debut works as more than just a cute little curio despite its thinness, is that it mines a sneaky emotionality from the bedrock of the film-within-a-film structure." Jennie Kermode of Eye For Film gave the film four and a half stars, writing "Beautifully drawn characters lend a lot of heart to a story which might easily have been told in a more mechanical way, and keep the human factor prominent. Legge doesn’t rely on the changing of the future to shock an audience which has heard that tale many times before, but weaves a more complex story, very neatly tied together and, in its totality, addressing one of science fiction’s trickier big questions." She also praised the soundtrack, "Rounding out all this, and coming into full bloom as we begin to see more of the reshaped future, is some brilliantly rewritten music, exploring how key songs and movements might have turned out in a different cultural context. This provides a strange form of delight as the story grows increasingly dark." Kim Newman also praised the soundtrack "whose sinister dystopian glam rock is horribly convincing" and concluded "this is an ingenious, exhilarating film: it demands rewatches, revels in time-twisting inventiveness and has a lot to say about the actual present day as it contemplates how good intentions might muck up the past".

Fionnuala Halligan of Screen Daily wrote a positive review of the film, stating that it is "conceptually sharp, with wonderful period sound work". Alistair Harkness of The Scotsman rated the film 3 stars out of 5, writing that "it’s neatly done, even if the apparent ubiquity of film stock in 1940s Britain isn’t quite as easily explained away as Thom and Martha’s possession of a light-weight, hand-held, sound-recording camera." Kaleem Aftab of Time Out rated the film 2 stars out of 5, writing that "There’s much to admire here, but with Legge’s keen eye for the technical side of cinema stronger than his narrative impulses, LOLA ultimately has to go down as an ambitious failure." Matthew Turner of Nerdly wrote "LOLA‘s use of archive footage is consistently inventive and largely flawless, to the point where you can’t be sure if you’re watching actual footage or something created especially for the movie (at least until Hitler shows up). Similarly, the script uses both real and imagined events of WWII to pose some intriguing questions about sacrifice and whether the ends justify the means, giving the film a strong present-day resonance in the process. On top of that, the use of music is equally inspired, whether it’s Martha performing a rocking 1940s version of The Kinks’ Girl, You Really Got Me Going (it’s possible to see the implied effect on The Kinks’ career as clever foreshadowing) or a vision of a dystopian future, where all pop music is fascistic in tone (written by Hannon) and the biggest pop star in the world is ‘Reginald Fucking Watson’ (Shaun Boylan)." Starburst also praised the performances and soundtrack writing "Beautifully soundtracked and well shot (using, in part, period accurate cameras), Lola is a clever and charming sci-fi comedy. Appleton and Martin both impress as the sisters, drawing a believable portrait of sisterly love, camaraderie and vastly different expressions of what Doing The Right Thing looks like.Offbeat as it may be, the stakes are real, and Lola conjures a number of classic time travel dilemmas and paradoxes, ultimately tying into the found footage form itself. Offbeat and unexpected, a truly unique utilisation of medium and, uh, Neil Hannon from The Divine Comedy." Dalas King in Flickfest also praised the originality of the film writing "Deftly combining multiple well-worn genres into something new and fresh, LOLA is one of the most original and compelling science fiction films of recent years."

References

External links
 
 

British science fiction films
Irish science fiction films
2022 science fiction films
Found footage films